Rafael Little (born September 23, 1986 in Anderson, South Carolina) is a former American football running back. He was signed by the Tennessee Titans as an undrafted free agent in 2008. He played college football at Kentucky.

Little has also been a member of the Winnipeg Blue Bombers and Calgary Stampeders of the Canadian Football League.

Statistics

External links
 Scout.com: Rafael Little Profile." Kentucky Wildcats Football, Basketball, and Recruiting Front Page. 24 April 2009

1986 births
Living people
American football running backs
Calgary Stampeders players
Canadian football running backs
Kentucky Wildcats football players
People from Anderson, South Carolina
Players of American football from South Carolina
Tennessee Titans players
Winnipeg Blue Bombers players